Ragnar Nikolay Larsen (7 January 1925 – 14 January 1982) was a Norwegian football midfielder. He later became a football manager and, after actively retiring from the sport, he took up a position as a sports journalist for Aftenposten, a Norwegian newspaper.

Larsen played as a midfielder and started his playing career with Sandaker. He then relocated to Italy in 1951, spending time at both Lazio and Genoa. He also spent time with Swiss side Lugano before returning to his first club and then retiring from the field in 1962.

Larsen was last capped in 1961, aged 37 years and 201 days, and is the fifth oldest player at the Norwegian national team.

As well as being capped for the Norway national football team, he was its manager for two different spells. He also coached Lillestrøm SK and Strømsgodset.

References

1925 births
1982 deaths
Footballers from Oslo
Association football midfielders
Norwegian footballers
Norway international footballers
S.S. Lazio players
FC Lugano players
Genoa C.F.C. players
Serie A players
Norwegian football managers
Norwegian expatriate football managers
FC Lugano managers
Norway national football team managers
Lillestrøm SK managers
Strømsgodset Toppfotball managers
Norwegian expatriate footballers
Expatriate footballers in Italy
Expatriate footballers in Switzerland
Norwegian expatriate sportspeople in Italy